El Caradura y la millonaria, also known as No estoy enamorada de tí, pero te quiero.  is a 1971 Argentine comedy film directed by Enrique Cahen Salaberry. It was one of several films by Cahen Salaberry after his return from Spain to Argentine cinema in the 1960s. The screenplay was written by Luis Cesar Amadori and Antonio Botta. It is a remake of the 1938 film El canillita y la dama. The film premiered on 6 March 1971, and starred Juan Carlos Altavista and María Vaner, with Vaner performing her own songs.

Plot
A wealthy man repents and traces his son from his first wife whom he abandoned while pregnant.

Cast
 Juan Carlos Altavista
 María Vaner
 Santiago Bal
 Aldo Bigatti
 Susana Brunetti
 Pablo Codevila
 Dringue Farías
 Guido Gorgatti
 Fidel Pintos
 Menchu Quesada
 Virginia Romay
 León Sarthié
 Semillita
 Tomás Simari
 Emilio Vidal
 Oscar Villa
 Susana Rubio

References

External links
 
Film poster

1971 films
Argentine comedy films
1970s Spanish-language films
Films directed by Enrique Cahen Salaberry
Remakes of Argentine films
1970s Argentine films